Unleashed Music is a Los Angeles-based marketing, management, label services and publishing consultancy, as well as an independent record label.

Company history
Unleashed Music was formed in New York City by musician and entrepreneur, Geordie Gillespie. It originated in 1988 as the publishing division of Dog Brothers Records, to administer the music of Konk (band).

In 2006, after 20 years of major label experience, Gillespie sought to expand the company's vision. The goal was to anticipate and utilize new media trends, platforms and strategies, while creating strong and equitable partnerships to develop artists' careers. By bundling marketing, promotion and production services, the company is structured to support any component of a music campaign.

Mission statement
Unleashed Music provides services and guidance to artists, labels, and organizations that seek to navigate, thrive and build success in the ever-changing music business landscape.

Rhythms del Mundo
In 2010 Unleashed Music released Rhythms del Mundo Revival. Rhythms del Mundo Revival is a nonprofit collaborative album, produced by Kenny Young, which fuses an all-star cast of Cuban musicians including Ibrahim Ferrer and Omara Portuondo of the Buena Vista Social Club with tracks from US, UK and Irish artists such as the Gorillaz, Dizzee Rascal, Bob Dylan, Groove Armada, Franz Ferdinand, and a collaboration between Coldplay and Lele.

The compilation was released together with Artists' Project Earth.

Artist campaigns
American Woves
Christopher Shayne
Miss Palmer
Ruby
Bethesda
Vayden
Ladina Spence
John Vlasic
Samantha Ronson
Craving Lucy
Silent Season
iHeartStereo
Little Hurricane
Little Barrie
Uncle Daddy
The Adventures Of..
Chris Shinn
The Whigs
Deadmau5
Until June
Delta Spirit
Iyeoka Okoawo

Label releases
Rhythms del Mundo Revival
Vayden
Vayden "HAM"
Konk - Definitive Collection
Konk - Konk Party
Konk - Live at CBGB
Konk - Your LIfe
Hide Your Kids - Bed Intruder

References

External links
Unleashed Music

American record labels
Record labels established in 1988
Rock record labels
Pop record labels
Companies based in Los Angeles
1988 establishments in New York City